Finland participated in the Eurovision Song Contest 2019 with the song "Look Away" written and performed by Ville Virtanen under the stage name Darude and Sebastian Rejman. Darude and Sebastian Rejman were internally selected by the Finnish broadcaster  (Yle) in January 2019 to represent the nation at the 2019 contest in Tel Aviv, Israel. The national final  2019 was organised in order to select the song that Darude and Rejman would perform. Three songs were selected to compete in the national final on 2 March 2019 where the 50/50 combination of votes from eight international jury groups and votes from the public selected "Look Away" as the winning song.

Finland was drawn to compete in the first semi-final of the Eurovision Song Contest which took place on 14 May 2019. Performing during the show in position 3, "Look Away" was not announced among the top 10 entries of the first semi-final and therefore did not qualify to compete in the final. It was later revealed that Finland placed seventeenth (last) out of the 17 participating countries in the semi-final with 23 points.

Background 

Prior to the 2019 contest, Finland had participated in the Eurovision Song Contest fifty-two times since its first entry in 1961. Finland has won the contest once in 2006 with the song "Hard Rock Hallelujah" performed by Lordi. In the 2018 contest, "Monsters" performed by Saara Aalto managed to qualify Finland to the final for the first time since 2014 and placed twenty-fifth.

The Finnish national broadcaster,  (Yle), broadcasts the event within Finland and organises the selection process for the nation's entry. Yle confirmed their intentions to participate at the 2019 Eurovision Song Contest on 13 September 2018. Finland's entries for the Eurovision Song Contest have been selected through national final competitions that have varied in format over the years. Between 1961 and 2011, a selection show that was often titled  highlighted that the purpose of the program was to select a song for Eurovision. However, since 2012, the broadcaster has organised the selection show  (UMK), which focuses on showcasing new music with the winning song being selected as the Finnish contest entry for that year. In 2018, Yle opted to internally select the artist with the song selected through , a procedure that continued for the Finnish entry for the 2019 contest as announced by the broadcaster along with their participation confirmation.

Before Eurovision

Artist selection 
Yle announced that they had internally selected DJ Darude and singer Sebastian Rejman to represent Finland in Tel Aviv during a live streamed press conference on 29 January 2019, hosted by 2013 Finnish Eurovision entrant Krista Siegfrids, Mikko Silvennoinen and Christoffer Strandberg. It was also announced during the press conference that their song would be selected through  2019 with three songs competing.

Uuden Musiikin Kilpailu 2019 
The three competing songs along with their promotional music videos were presented on 8, 15 and 22 February 2019, respectively, while the final took place on 2 March 2019 at the Logomo in Turku and hosted by Krista Siegfrids, Mikko Silvennoinen and Christoffer Strandberg. The show was broadcast on Yle TV2, online at yle.fi/umk and via radio with commentary in Swedish by Eva Frantz and Johan Lindroos on Yle X3M. All three competing songs were performed by Darude and Sebastian Rejman and "Look Away" was selected as the winning song by a 50/50 combination of public votes and eight international jury groups from the United Kingdom, Norway, Spain, Czech Republic, Sweden, Ireland, Denmark and Israel. The viewers and the juries each had a total of 240 points to award. Each jury group distributed their points as follows: 8, 10 and 12 points. The viewer vote was based on the percentage of votes each song achieved through the following voting methods: telephone, SMS and online voting. For example, if a song gained 10% of the viewer vote, then that entry would be awarded 10% of 240 points rounded to the nearest integer: 24 points.

In addition to the performances of the competing songs, the interval act featured Danish Eurovision Song Contest 2013 winner Emmelie de Forest performing her winning Eurovision entry "Only Teardrops". The competition was watched by 358,000 viewers in Finland.

Promotion
Darude and Sebastian Rejman made several appearances across Europe to specifically promote "Look Away" as the Finnish Eurovision entry. On 6 April, Darude and Sebastian Rejman performed during the Eurovision in Concert event which was held at the AFAS Live venue in Amsterdam, Netherlands and hosted by Cornald Maas and Marlayne. On 14 April, they performed during the London Eurovision Party, which was held at the Café de Paris venue in London, United Kingdom and hosted by Nicki French and Paddy O'Connell. On 19 April, Darude and Rejman performed during the PreParty ES event which was held at the Sala La Riviera venue in Madrid, Spain and hosted by Julia Varela and Tony Aguilar.

At Eurovision 
According to Eurovision rules, all nations with the exceptions of the host country and the "Big Five" (France, Germany, Italy, Spain and the United Kingdom) are required to qualify from one of two semi-finals in order to compete for the final; the top ten countries from each semi-final progress to the final. The European Broadcasting Union (EBU) split up the competing countries into six different pots based on voting patterns from previous contests, with countries with favourable voting histories put into the same pot. On 28 January 2019, a special allocation draw was held which placed each country into one of the two semi-finals, as well as which half of the show they would perform in. Finland was placed into the first semi-final, held on 14 May 2019, and was scheduled to perform in the first half of the show.

Once all the competing songs for the 2019 contest had been released, the running order for the semi-finals was decided by the shows' producers rather than through another draw, so that similar songs were not placed next to each other. Finland was set to perform in position 3, following the entry from Montenegro and preceding the entry from Poland.

The two semi-finals and the final were televised in Finland on Yle TV2 with a second audio program providing commentary in Finnish by 2013 Finnish Eurovision entrant Krista Siegfrids and Mikko Silvennoinen and in Swedish by Eva Frantz and Johan Lindroos. The three shows were broadcast via radio with Finnish commentary by Sanna Pirkkalainen and Toni Laaksonen in the two semi-finals and by Sanna Pirkkalainen and Sami Sykkö in the final on Yle Radio Suomi. The Finnish spokesperson, who announced the top 12-point score awarded by the Finnish jury during the final, was Christoffer Strandberg.

Semi-final 

Darude and Sebastian Rejman took part in technical rehearsals on 4 and 9 May, followed by dress rehearsals on 13 and 14 May. This included the jury show on 13 May where the professional juries of each country watched and voted on the competing entries.

The Finnish performance featured Darude with a DJ mixing table on a platform to the left of the stage and Sebastian Rejman performing on the triangular catwalk, joined by a female dancer performing a choreographed routine on a raised platform in the centre of the stage. The LED screens displayed images showing global warming and the dancer appearing underwater as she at times disappear from the stage. The female dancer that joined Darude and Sebastian Rejman on stage was Etel Röhr and additional off-stage backing vocals were provided by Heini Ikonen, Matti Leino and Petri Somer.

At the end of the show, Finland was not announced among the top 10 entries in the first semi-final and therefore failed to qualify to compete in the final. It was later revealed that Finland placed seventeenth (last) in the semi-final, receiving a total of 23 points: 14 points from the televoting and 9 points from the juries.

Voting
Voting during the three shows involved each country awarding two sets of points from 1-8, 10 and 12: one from their professional jury and the other from televoting. Each nation's jury consisted of five music industry professionals who are citizens of the country they represent, with their names published before the contest to ensure transparency. This jury judged each entry based on: vocal capacity; the stage performance; the song's composition and originality; and the overall impression by the act. In addition, no member of a national jury was permitted to be related in any way to any of the competing acts in such a way that they cannot vote impartially and independently. The individual rankings of each jury member as well as the nation's televoting results were released shortly after the grand final.

Below is a breakdown of points awarded to Finland and awarded by Finland in the first semi-final and grand final of the contest, and the breakdown of the jury voting and televoting conducted during the two shows:

Points awarded to Finland

Points awarded by Finland

Detailed voting results
The following members composed the Finnish jury:
 Susanna Vainiola (jury chairperson)music journalist, radio DJ
 Eva Louhivuorimusician
 singer, songwriter, lyricist
 producer, songwriter, musician
 Janne Hyötysongwriter, composer, producer, musician

References

External links 
Official Yle Eurovision site

2019
Countries in the Eurovision Song Contest 2019
Eurovision
Eurovision